Ynso Scholten (1 February 1918 – 13 June 1984) was a Dutch politician of the defunct Christian Historical Union (CHU) now merged into the Christian Democratic Appeal (CDA) and lawyer.

Decorations

References

External links

Official
  Mr. Y. (Ynso) Scholten Parlement & Politiek

1918 births
1984 deaths
Christian Historical Union politicians
Commanders of the Order of Orange-Nassau
Dutch members of the Dutch Reformed Church
Lawyers from Amsterdam
Ministers of Justice of the Netherlands
Politicians from Amsterdam
State Secretaries for Education of the Netherlands
Vrije Universiteit Amsterdam alumni
20th-century Dutch lawyers
20th-century Dutch politicians